Przewodziszowice Castle - brick fortress ruins, located on the peripheries of the former village of Przewodziszowice (now part of the town of Żarki), on the Kraków-Częstochowa Upland.

History
The fortress was raised in the fourteenth, or on the turn of the fourteenth and fifteenth-century, as commanded by the Polish monarch Casimir III the Great, or Silesian duke Vladislaus II of Opole. Together with the Suliszowice Fortress, the fortresses served as a propounded flank of what now remains of the castle ruins located in the small forest osada of Ostrężnik Gmina Janów. In the fifteenth-century, the castle reserved as the residence for knight-highwayman Mikołaj Kornicz Siestrzeniec, known as "Siestrzeniec". According to a legend, the knight hid his loot in stone fissures or the castle well.

References

Castles in Silesian Voivodeship
Myszków County